Goodere is a surname. Notable people with the name include:

 Sir Henry Goodere (1534–1595), English nobleman
 Sir Henry Goodere (1571–1627), English courtier
 Sir Edward Goodere, 1st Baronet (1657–1739), British politician
 Sir John Dineley Goodere, 2nd Baronet (c. 1680–1741), English aristocrat and murder victim
 Samuel Goodere (1687–1741), captain in the Royal Navy
 Sir John Dineley-Goodere, 5th Baronet (1729–1809), English eccentric

See also 
 Goodere baronets
 Goodier, a surname
 Goodyear, a surname
 Goodyer, a surname